The Jamestown Foundation is a Washington, D.C.-based conservative defense policy think tank. Founded in 1984 as a platform to support Soviet defectors, its stated mission today is to inform and educate policy makers about events and trends, which it regards as being of current strategic importance to the United States. Jamestown publications focus on China, Russia, Eurasia, and global terrorism.

Founding and mission
The Jamestown Foundation was founded in 1984 after Arkady Shevchenko, the highest-ranking Soviet official ever to defect when he left his position as Under-Secretary-General of the United Nations, defected in 1978. William Geimer, an American lawyer, had been working closely with Shevchenko, and established the foundation as a vehicle to promote the writings of the former Soviet diplomat and those of Ion Pacepa, a former top Romanian intelligence officer; with the help of the foundation, both defectors published bestselling books. Central Intelligence Agency Director William J. Casey helped back the formation of the Jamestown Foundation, agreeing with its complaints that the U.S. intelligence community did not provide sufficient funding of Soviet bloc defectors. The foundation, initially also dedicated to supporting Soviet dissidents, also aided defecting intellectuals from the Eastern Bloc in disseminating their ideas in the west.

Board of directors
In the past, Jamestown's board of directors has included Zbigniew Brzezinski, former National Security Advisor to U.S. President Jimmy Carter. Jamestown's current board includes Dr. Michael Carpenter, the managing director of the Penn Biden Center for Diplomacy and Global Engagement. Carpenter previously served in the Pentagon as Deputy Assistant Secretary of Defense and in the White House as a foreign policy advisor to current President Joe Biden (when Biden was vice president under Barack Obama) as well as on the National Security Council as Director for Russia. Jamestown's board also includes Michael G. Vickers, who previously served as the Under Secretary of Defense for Intelligence and whose role at the Central Intelligence Agency during the Soviet–Afghan War was famously featured in George Crile's 2003 book Charlie Wilson's War. 

As of 2021, the foundation's current board includes General Michael V. Hayden; Bruce Hoffman; Matthew Bryza; Robert Spalding, who acted as an architect of US-China strategy while serving on the National Security Council in the Donald Trump administration; Michelle Van Cleave; Arthur Waldron; and Timothy J. Keating, while Jamestown's fellows included Vladimir Socor; Janusz Bugajski; Paul Goble; Michael Scheuer (who claims to have been fired for criticizing the United States' relationship with Israel), Thomas Kent, the former president of Radio Free Europe/Radio Liberty; Willy Wo-Lap Lam, a Hong Kong-based China specialist; Jacob Zenn, a leading expert on Boko Haram; and Stephen Ulph, a leading expert on Jihadist ideology.

Activities
Its primary focus is on China, Eurasia, Russia, and global terrorism. As of 2008, its publications were Eurasia Daily Monitor, Terrorism Monitor, and China Brief. Previous publications included Eurasia Security Trends, Fortnight in Review, North Korea Review, Russia and Eurasia Review, Russia's Week, Spotlight on Terror, North Caucasus Weekly, (formerly Chechnya Weekly) and Recent From Turkey and Terrorism Focus. Along with these publications, Jamestown produces occasional reports and books.

Nikolai Getman collection
The foundation hosted Russian artist Nikolai Getman's paintings of Gulag camps. Getman was imprisoned for eight years by the Soviet regime for participating in anti-Soviet propaganda as a result of a caricature of Joseph Stalin that one of his friends had drawn on a cigarette box. He survived, and for four decades he secretly labored at creating a visual record of the Gulag system. In September 2009, the Jamestown Foundation transferred the Getman collection to the Heritage Foundation.

Reception
In 2007, the Russian government said the think-tank was spreading anti-Russian propaganda by hosting a debate on violence in the Russian republic of Ingushetia. According to a statement by the Foreign Ministry of Russia: "Organisers again and again resorted to deliberately spreading slander about the situation in Chechnya and other republics of the Russian North Caucasus using the services of supporters of terrorists and pseudo-experts. Speakers were given carte blanche to spread extremist propaganda, incite ethnic and inter-religious discord." In response, Jamestown Foundation president Glen Howard said that Russia was "intimidated by the power of the free word and this goes against the state manipulation of the media in Russia."

On 8 December 2011, Ambassador Daniel Benjamin, State Department Counterterrorism Coordinator for the Obama administration, gave the keynote address at Jamestown's Fifth Annual Terrorism Conference where he praised Jamestown for its research and analysis of terrorism issues.

The Jamestown Foundation was criticized by the Right Web project (now the "Militarist Monitor" project) based at the Institute for Policy Studies for alleged links to the CIA and for advancing a right-wing, neoconservative agenda. 

In 2020, the office of the Prosecutor-General of Russia said that Jamestown Foundation's publications sought to fan separatism in some Russian regions and posed a security threat. It described the Foundation as an "undesirable organisation", which could result in the organization being banned in Russia under the Russian foreign agent law.

References

External links

Foreign policy and strategy think tanks in the United States
Think tanks established in 1984
Charities based in Washington, D.C.
Undesirable organizations in Russia